This is a list of countries by inequality-adjusted Human Development Index (IHDI), as published by the UNDP in its 2022 Human Development Report. According to the 2016 Report, "The IHDI can be interpreted as the level of human development when inequality is accounted for," whereas the Human Development Index itself, from which the IHDI is derived, is "an index of potential human development (or the maximum IHDI that could be achieved if there were no inequality)."

Methodology 

The index captures the HDI of the average person in society, which is less than the aggregate HDI when there is inequality in the distribution of health, education and income. Under perfect equality, the HDI and IHDI are equal; the greater the difference between the two, the greater the inequality.

The IHDI, estimated for 151 countries (includes the world and other 150 specific countries), captures the losses in human development due to inequality in health, education and income. Losses in all three dimensions vary across countries, ranging from just a few percent (Czech Republic, Slovenia) up to over 40% (Comoros, Central African Republic). Overall loss takes into account all three dimensions.

List 
The table below ranks countries according to their inequality-adjusted human development index (IHDI). Data is based on 2021 estimates.

2021 inequality-adjusted HDI (IHDI) (2022 report)

See also
 List of countries by Human Development Index
 List of countries by planetary pressures–adjusted Human Development Index
 List of countries by income equality
 List of countries by share of income of the richest one percent
 Social Progress Index
 Economic inequality
 Median income
 Per capita income
 Poverty
 Social inequality
 Welfare's effect on poverty
 Human Development Report

Notes

References

External links
 Human Development Reports

 

Inequality-Adjusted
Global inequality